Mill Creek is a  long tributary of Lake Erie in Erie County in the U.S. state of Pennsylvania. It flows from Millcreek Township through the city of Erie, into Presque Isle Bay.

Much of the creek in the city was channeled into the Mill Creek Tube, which was constructed after Mill Creek's disastrous flood  struck the city in 1915.

Course 
Mill Creek begins in extreme eastern Millcreek Township and travels westward until it is joined by a couple of smaller tributary streams. From there, it roughly follows Pennsylvania Route 505 (Glenwood Park Avenue) northward until the creek is diverted underground.

The creek passes through the middle of the Erie Zoo, where several bridges span the creek. One of the bridges is designed to act as a "drift catcher", preventing large debris from entering the tube further downstream. The drift catcher is also used by the zoo's train to cross over Mill Creek.

At 30th Street, Mill Creek is diverted underground, for over  through the Mill Creek Tube and passes underneath downtown Erie. The creek reappears above ground on the northern side of the Bayfront Parkway before emptying into Presque Isle Bay at the eastern end of the bay near South Pier.

History 
The city of Erie and Millcreek Township were both settled in 1795. Erie County was formed from portions from Allegheny County on March 12, 1800, with the township being incorporated at the same time.

Mills
The first mill in Erie County was built at the mouth of the creek, giving the creek its name. By 1835, four gristmills and thirteen sawmills were located along and powered by the Mill Creek.

Flood 
Mill Creek had a history of overflowing its banks, with one happening in 1893; however the worst such flood occurred on August 3, 1915.
banks collapsed, carrying numerous small outbuildings into the creek. The resulting debris obstructed a culvert under 26th Street, producing a reservoir extending for four city blocks. Attempts to clear the blockage involving the use of dynamite failed.

Around 8:30 PM the culvert gave way, releasing the pent-up floodwaters into downtown Erie. In all, 225 houses were damaged or destroyed, along with over 300 other buildings and 36 fatalities. To prevent another flood, the city enclosed Mill Creek in a concrete tube running underneath the city.

Mill Creek Tube 

Built to prevent another catastrophic flood similar to the one in 1915, the tube was completed in 1923. It begins on the southern side of West 30th Street and terminates on the northern side of the Bayfront Parkway.

As the tube is "large enough for a Jeep or [a] pickup to ride through—and turn around in", it is occasionally the site of water rescues when people have been swept into it when the creek is high and have become stranded. One such rescue occurred on July 26, 2007, after three teenagers were caught up in the swiftly moving Mill Creek. One was rescued by firefighters near the mouth of the tube, another near 26th Street, and one traversed the entire tube before being rescued.

It was built at the same time as the tube. The catcher was modified in 1965 to accommodate the Erie Zoo's miniature railroad. It underwent a $476,800 restoration from May to August 2010 to seal cracks, repair deteriorating concrete and inspect one of the bridge's retaining walls.

See also 

 Lake Erie Watershed (Pennsylvania)
 List of rivers of Pennsylvania

References

Sources 

 
 
 
 
 
 
 

Erie, Pennsylvania
Rivers of Pennsylvania
Subterranean rivers of the United States
Tributaries of Lake Erie
Rivers of Erie County, Pennsylvania